A cabin boy is a servant on a ship.

Cabin Boy may also refer to:
 "Cabin Boy" (short story), a 1951 science fiction story by Damon Knight
 "Cabin Boy" (song), a 1984 song by Tom Robinson on the album Hope and Glory
 Cabin Boy, a 1994 fantasy comedy film directed by Adam Resnick
 A catamite or paramour employed in a menial capacity as pretense